Datin Seri Dayang Nur Camelia binti Tan Sri Abang Khalid (born 20 June 1974) also known as Camelia is a Malaysian singer and model. She was the first Malaysian to be signed to Universal Music. Her first album, Camelia, won the Best New Artist and Best Vocal Performance in an Album awards from Anugerah Industri Muzik (AIM). From 2003, she was the Malaysian spokesmodel for L'Oréal. She has also been the spokesmodel for TAG Heuer, Wacoal, Epson, Pantene and Omega.

Discography

Albums

TV program
 Casa Impian (Astro Ria; 1998 - 2006)

Awards
 Anugerah Industri Muzik (AIM) 1998
 Best New Artist
 Best Vocal Performance in an Album for "Camelia"

Personal life
She was married to Mohd Ehsan Tun Ahmad Zaidi Adruce until their divorce in 1999. She then married a prominent local developer who is Datuk Seri Akhbar Khan and was blessed with a daughter, Aisha Asmara Khan, 14, through her second marriage in 2010.

References

External links
 Profile at Faces.com.my

1974 births
Living people
People from Sarawak
21st-century Malaysian women singers
Malay-language singers
20th-century Malaysian women singers